A list of films produced in Brazil in 1946:

See also
 1946 in Brazil

External links
Brazilian films of 1946 at the Internet Movie Database

Brazil
1946
Films